Todavía Me Amas: Lo Mejor De Aventura (English: You Still Love Me: The Best Of Aventura) is a greatest hits album by Bachata group Aventura. It contains the best songs from their five studio albums and three of their greatest hit studio songs from the live album K.O.B. Live. This album was named after the song "Todavía Me Amas (You Still Love Me)" from the album We Broke The Rules.

Tracklist

Charts

Weekly charts

Year-end charts

Certifications

References

External links
Aventura official site

2016 greatest hits albums
Aventura (band) compilation albums